Joseph Price House is a historic home located in West Whiteland Township, Chester County, Pennsylvania. The house was built in 1878, and altered after 1894.  The original house was a two-story, "L"-shaped limestone dwelling with a steeply pitched roof and cross gable. Later alterations added a rambling addition, porte cochere, and full length porch. It is in a Queen Anne / Gothic style.

It was listed on the National Register of Historic Places in 1984.

References

Houses on the National Register of Historic Places in Pennsylvania
Queen Anne architecture in Pennsylvania
Gothic Revival architecture in Pennsylvania
Houses completed in 1894
Houses in Chester County, Pennsylvania
National Register of Historic Places in Chester County, Pennsylvania